Rhaphiptera durantoni is a species of beetle in the family Cerambycidae. It was described by Tavakilian and Touroult in 2007. It is known from French Guiana.

References

durantoni
Beetles described in 2007